The physical activity level (PAL) is a way to express a person's daily physical activity as a number, and is used to estimate a person's total energy expenditure. In combination with the basal metabolic rate, it can be used to compute the amount of food energy a person needs to consume in order to maintain a particular lifestyle.

Definition 

The physical activity level is defined for a non-pregnant, non-lactating adult as that person's total energy expenditure (TEE) in a 24-hour period, divided by his or her basal metabolic rate (BMR):

The physical activity level can also be estimated based on a list of the (physical) activities a person performs from day to day. Each activity is connected to a number, the physical activity ratio. The physical activity level is then the time-weighted average of the physical activity ratios.

Examples 
The following table shows indicative numbers for the Physical activity level for several lifestyles:

References

Physical exercise
Sports nutrition